Gerald Quitaleg Bantag is a Filipino corrections officer and former warden who serves as Director-General of the Bureau of Corrections.

Education
Bantag attended the Philippine National Police Academy (PNPA), where he graduated as part of the Kaagapay class of 1996.

Career

Jail warden
Bantag has served as warden in Parañaque, Manila, Malabon, Navotas, and Valenzuela.

In August 2007, Bantag was formally accused of attempting to murder a teenager in Caloocan when he was Navotas City Bureau of Jail Management and Penology (BJMP) chief. He denied such allegations.

He also headed the BJMP regional office in Mimaropa.

When Bantag was overseeing the Parañaque City Jail in August 2016, he was injured when a grenade exploded in the prison which also killed 10 detainees. The inmates earlier sought to conduct talks with Bantag regarding their concerns of his supposed plan to move them and conduct an inspection for contrabands.

He was moved to the Manila City Jail after the explosion incident. On October 23, 2016, 30 inmates staged a riot protesting against plans to segregate the 2,000 detainees of the prison charged for drug-related offenses and called for Bantag's removal as warden. They also alleged that under his watch, the Manila prison has started disallowing visitors to bring in food from the outside which meant that they could only buy food from establishments inside the prison which are supposedly more expensive.

Bureau of Corrections
Bantag was designated as Director General of the Bureau of Corrections (BuCor) by President Rodrigo Duterte on September 17, 2019. He took oath as bureau chief, three days later on September 20. His predecessor Nicanor Faeldon was dismissed for failing to head to Duterte's order to stop the release of 2,000 heinous crime convicts under the Good Conduct Time Allowance Law. His assumption to the office was under secondment from the BJMP, which meant he retained his previous position with the agency. He would be appointed directly to the BuCor, by Duterte on March 4, 2022. He would take oath again on March 8.

His reappointment meant that he would serve as chief of BuCor even after Duterte's presidency expired. His tenure continued to the President Bongbong Marcos' administration.

Killing of Percy Lapid

Bantag was implicated to the killing of radio broadcaster and journalist Percy Lapid. President Marcos ordered Justice secretary Jesus Crispin Remulla to place Bantag under preventive suspension for 90 days pending investigation on his role on the killing. The National Bureau of Investigation (NBI) and the Philippine National Police would file charges against several people in connection to Lapid's death including Bantag who was formally charged of murder. Bantag has been subject to criticism by Lapid on his radio program Lapid Fire.

A demonstration was held in Baguio in support of Bantag. Salvador Panelo has raised the possibility that Bantag was framed.

Personal life
Bantag is an Igorot.

References

Filipino prison officials
Prison administrators
People charged with murder
Year of birth missing (living people)
Living people